The following are the football (soccer) events of the year 1915 throughout the world.

Events
Several European leagues suspended play because of World War I.

Winners club national championship
Argentina: Racing Club
Austria: Wiener AC
Cuba: Hispano América (La Habana)
Denmark: B93
England: Everton F.C.
Iceland: Fram
Italy: Genoa 1893
Luxembourg: US Hollerich
Netherlands: Sparta Rotterdam
Paraguay: Cerro Porteño
Scotland: For fuller coverage, see 1914-15 in Scottish football.
Scottish Division One – Celtic
Scottish Division Two – Cowdenbeath
Scottish Cup – No competition
Sweden: Djurgårdens IF
Uruguay: Nacional
Greece: 1913 to 1921 - no championship titles due to the First World War and the Greco-Turkish War of 1919-1922.

International tournaments
1915 Far Eastern Championship Games
 China

Births 
 February 20 – Elba de Padua Lima, Brazilian international footballer and coach manager (died 1984)
 February 23 – Heinz Flotho, German international footballer (died 2000)
 March 16 – Wilhelm Simetsreiter, German international footballer (died 2001)
 March 30 – Arsenio Erico, Paraguayan international footballer (died 1977)
 September 15 – Helmut Schön, German international footballer and manager (died 1996)

Deaths
November 11 - Robert Barker (footballer)

References 

 
Association football by year